Cahuenga Branch is the third oldest branch library facility in the Los Angeles Public Library system. Located at 4591 Santa Monica Boulevard in the East Hollywood section of Los Angeles, it was built in 1916 with a grant from Andrew Carnegie. One of three surviving Carnegie libraries in Los Angeles, it has been designated as a Historic-Cultural Monument and listed in the National Register of Historic Places.

Construction and opening 
The Caheunga Branch was the last of six branch libraries built with a $210,000 grant from steel baron Andrew Carnegie. The architect was Clarence H. Russell (1874–1942), who was also associated with Norman F. Marsh in building the Venice canals. Though the building and equipment were paid for through the Carnegie grant, the land itself was purchased by the city with the cost being paid through an assessment district. The library was originally planned for the corner of Santa Monica Boulevard and Vermont Avenue, but the land at Santa Monica and Madison was chosen "because it was less expensive."

Constructed of brick and concrete at a cost of $34,000, the library was built in a clover leaf or butterfly pattern "whereby the entire floor may be supervised from a centrally located delivery desk." The first floor included a children's department, overflow reading room, fiction section, reference room and adult reading room. The basement contained an auditorium with a seating capacity of 300 persons. The branch also included an "open air reading room" at the northwest corner on the Madison Avenue side. The building's exterior also presents an impressive facade. The building is designed in the Italian Renaissance Revival style with a high basement, a low-pitched overhanging hip roof of clay tiles, and a tawny-colored tapestry brick facing. "The front elevation is symmetrical, and is dominated by a large, formal entranceway featuring a double stairway with matching volutes leading up from the sidewalk to the portal where it forms a veranda with classical balustrade."

The city's Handbook of the Branch Libraries described the Cahuenga Branch as follows: "It is a substantial and dignified Italian faced building faced with brick laid in pattern and panels, with a grand exterior central stairway leading upward to the main entrance and down to the basement club room and auditorium."

At the opening ceremony on December 4, 1916, City Librarian Everett Perry gave a speech welcoming the East Hollywood community to the new library. Perry encouraged the community to make full use of the books and other resources, including the auditorium and children's story hour. In describing the scope of the books available at the branch, Perry made comments that might have been viewed a century later as sexist or puritanical:

Carnegie paid for a total of six libraries in Los Angeles, and only three of the Carnegie libraries remain: Cahuenga, Vermont Square and Lincoln Heights.

History

Surrounding community
The branch was situated in a part of the city with many educational, cultural and medical institutions. The original campus of UCLA was located near the Cahuenga Branch, and even after UCLA moved in the late 1920s, its old campus was occupied by what became Los Angeles City College. Also within a one-mile (1.6 km) radius of the branch are the Braille Institute, Barnsdall Art Park (site of Frank Lloyd Wright's Hollyhock House), KCET public television station, Children's Hospital, and Queen of Angels-Hollywood Presbyterian Hospital. The proximity of these centers led to great demand for the library resources at the Cahuenga Branch.

World War I 
During World War I, the Cahuenga Branch (like other city libraries) turned over a portion of its space to war-related activities. One area resident recalled, "I remember when they were rolling bandages in the Library Auditorium during World War I, and they used to have community sings every week." Over 100 people attended the community sings until the 1918 flu epidemic put an end to such gaterhings.

Ethnic diversification 
By the 1960s and 1970s, old residents of East Hollywood were moving to the suburbs, and increasing numbers of Asians, Latinos, Russians and Armenians moved into the area. In order to serve its non-English speaking community, the Cahuenga Branch received funds from the federal government in the early 1970s to hire a multi-lingual staff, offer classes in English and citizenship, and to host live entertainment and festivals for the community.

Closure and renovation
In 1990, the Cahuenga Branch closed when it was discovered that it did not meet earthquake safety codes. The branch was moved to temporary space at 4627 Santa Monica Boulevard for the next six years while the old building underwent seismic and renovation work. In 1996, the renovation work was completed, and the Cahuenga Branch reopened. Columnist Patt Morrison wrote at the time: "Before it closed for its make-over in 1990, the Cahuenga branch was a dark and grotty hole, a spirit-shriveler of a place that was intended to uplift – 'the scariest place I ever worked,' one of its alumni librarians declared – and indeed, the only people who found it perfect were the film crews that made horror movies in its vanished gloom."

In addition to the physical plant, the renovation work included installation of computer work stations and other technological upgrades as part of the "Libraries Online!" project funded by Bill Gates and Microsoft Corporation. The confluence of funding at opposite ends of the century by two of the world's wealthiest men, one a steel baron, the other a silicon baron, led Patt Morrison to write: "What a collision of history that these two men, Carnegie and Gates, financial visionaries born more than a century apart, would intersect at the corner of Santa Monica Boulevard and Madison Avenue."

Centennial
The library celebrated its 100th anniversary with a public celebration on December 3, 2016. In the week prior to the event, the LAPL performed the first major improvements to the library since 1996 with repainting, cleaning, repairs, landscaping and the installation of new bicycle racks. At the public celebration, the program included family entertainment, a historic lecture on the Carnegie libraries, an information fair featuring the Los Angeles Public Library and various community organizations, a music performance by students from nearby Lockwood Avenue Elementary School, and a formal program featuring speeches by L.A. City Councilmember Mitch O'Farrell and City Librarian John Szabo. Attendees sang "Happy Birthday to You" to the library and were served a large birthday cake.

Historic designation

The Cahuenga Branch was designated as a Historic-Cultural Monument (#314) by the Los Angeles Cultural Heritage Commission in 1986. In 1987, the Lincoln Heights Branch and several other branch libraries in Los Angeles were added to the National Register of Historic Places as part of a thematic group submission. The application noted that the branch libraries had been constructed in a variety of period revival styles to house the initial branch library system of the City of Los Angeles.

In December 2016, for the library's centennial, a plaque recognizing the building's Historic-Cultural Monument designation was installed inside the library, as well as a sign placed in front of the library on Santa Monica Boulevard, commemorating its 100th anniversary and Historic-Cultural Monument status.

See also 

 List of Registered Historic Places in Los Angeles
 Los Angeles Public Library

References

External links
 Cahuenga Branch Library - Los Angeles Public Library

Library buildings completed in 1916
Carnegie libraries in California
Libraries on the National Register of Historic Places in Los Angeles
Los Angeles Historic-Cultural Monuments
Buildings and structures in Hollywood, Los Angeles
Libraries in Los Angeles
Mediterranean Revival architecture in California
Renaissance Revival architecture in California
Italian Renaissance Revival architecture in the United States
East Hollywood, Los Angeles